Jason Hewitt (born 28 August 1983 in Manchester, England) is an English professional ice hockey player currently playing for the Sheffield Steeldogs in the NIHL.

Career stats

References

External links

Jason Hewitt Personal Profile, Manchester Phoenix Official Website.
Jason Hewitt Personal Profile, Sheffield Steelers Official Website.
"Hewitt Commits Future To Steelers", BBC Sport, 17/04/07
Hewitt The Latest to Re-Commit To Steelers, EIHL Official Website, 26/05/09

1983 births
Basingstoke Bison players
English ice hockey forwards
Hull Pirates players
Living people
London Racers players
Manchester Phoenix players
Sheffield Steelers players